Pothanpuram or Pothenpuram is a location near Pampady, Kottayam district, Kerala, India.

Access
Pothanpuram can be reached from Pampady town by Public & Private Transport System, KSRTC etc. Exactly Pothanpuram can be reached from Alampally, towards Manthuruthy Road. Pothanpuram is a hilly area.

Pilgrim Center
Mainly the Pilgrim Centre of Orthodox Christians, where Pampady Thirumeni rests.

References

Villages in Kottayam district